Hoorn is the main railway station of the town of Hoorn, Netherlands.

Overview
The station opened on 20 May 1884 as part of the Zaandam–Hoorn railway line. On 6 June 1885 the line was extended to Enkhuizen. Other lines that opened were the Hoorn - Medemblik line in 1887, and the Hoorn - Heerhugowaard line in October 1898. The station has a ticket hall, a florist, a music shop and a restaurant.

In 1985 another station opened in Hoorn, to the east, Hoorn Kersenboogerd. Now behind the station is the steam railway from Hoorn - Medemblik, the Steamtrain Hoorn Medemblik. From 8 May 2009 the Stoptrein 3300 was cut between Hoorn and Hoorn Kersenboogerd, but returned in December 2009

Train services

The following services currently call at Hoorn:
2x per hour intercity service Enkhuizen - Hoorn - Amsterdam - Hilversum - Amersfoort (-Deventer)
2x per hour intercity service Enkhuizen - Hoorn - Amsterdam (peak hours)
2x per hour local service (sprinter) Hoofddorp - Schiphol - Zaandam - Hoorn Kersenboogerd
2x per hour local service (sprinter) Hoorn - Alkmaar - Uitgeest - Haarlem - Amsterdam

Bus services
Buses depart from the bus station outside the station. Services are operated by Connexxion, with the exception of 314 and 317, which are operated by EBS (subsidiary of Egged).

External links
NS website 
Dutch public transport travel planner 

Railway stations in North Holland
Railway Station
Railway stations opened in 1884